ICAC Investigators 1998 is a 1998 Hong Kong television crime drama miniseries co-produced by Television Broadcasts Limited and the Independent Commission Against Corruption of Hong Kong. It is the ninth installment of the ICAC Investigators series with Ti Lung being the only actor to reprise his role from the previous installment, ICAC Investigators 1996. The series was released to celebrate the 25th anniversary of the establishment of the ICAC.

Cast and synopsis

ICAC officials

Episode 1: Farewell The Grand Play (再見大龍鳳)
The leader of the Special Duties Squad is accepting bribes and is secretly harboring a prostitution ring.  He arranges fake anti-vice operations with paid actors as the scapegoats of crimes. After investigation by the ICAC, the black sheep of the police force is brought to justice, preventing the reappearance of corruption tactics that existed in the 1960s-70s.

Written by Cheung Lik. Directed by Terry Tong

Episode 2: The Hundred Million Rule (億萬裁決)
A financial tycoon is highly ambitious and his businesses are expanding. It turns out the funds are from bribing officers from a financial company. When his investment fails, its subsidiary companies are closed down, resulting in the company's shares taking a plunge, with investors suffering heavy losses, triggering a financial crisis. As the ICAC investigates, criminals are finally brought to justice.

Written by Hui Man-ho. Directed by Chow Fai

Episode 3: The Boss Got Brains (老細有料)
Through intermediaries, health inspectors are accepting bribes from a restaurant proprietor for providing them with surprise inspection tips. One restaurant proprietor cannot condone these acts of extortion and reports the situation to the ICAC and also provides them with assistance. However, the corrupt men are very cunning and after repeated battles of wits with the ICAC, the culprit is finally arrested.

Written by Alex Cheung, Cheung Muk. Directed by Alex Cheung

Episode 4: Money for Buying Road (買路錢)
An engineer of the Transport Department abuses his power by making things difficult for the manager of the parking lot expansion company in order to obtain bribes. After some investigation, the ICAC discovers a voir dire that involves a senior official of the Lands Department. The ICAC eventually brings the criminals to justice.

Written by Chan Man-keung. Directed by Terry Tong

Episode 5: Special Channel (特別通道)
A case involving a mainland Chinese businessman using a fake passport triggers a series of corruption activities, including a foreign consular accepting bribes to forge travel documents. Cooperating with the Immigration Department, the ICAC sends undercover investigators to investigate, and successfully brings all criminals to justice.

Written by Chan Man-keung, Law Lai-kei. Directed by Chow Fai

External links
ICAC Investigators 1998 at Douban

Hong Kong television series
TVB dramas
Hong Kong crime television series
ICAC Investigators (TV series)
1998 Hong Kong television series debuts
1998 Hong Kong television series endings
1990s Hong Kong television series